Ellard is a surname and given name. The surname is found in Ireland and England among other places. Notable people with the name include:

Surname:
Brian Ellard (born 1940), Canadian educator, musicologist, arranger, and conductor
David Ellard (born 1989), Australian rules footballer
Henry Ellard (born 1961), former American football wide receiver
Kelly Ellard, murderer of Reena Virk in Saanich, British Columbia, Canada
Tom Ellard (born 1962), Australian electronic musician

Given name:
Ellard O'Brien (born 1930), retired Canadian professional ice hockey player
Ellard A. Walsh (1887–1975), U.S. National Guard and Army officer

See also
Bayley-Ellard High School, Roman Catholic secondary school in Madison, New Jersey
Bellard
Wellard